Gol Khun (also Romanized as Gol Khūn and Gel Khūn; also known as Gerkhūn-e Shūbāzār) is a village in Kaftarak Rural District, in the Central District of Shiraz County, Fars Province, Iran. At the 2006 census, its population was 739, in 178 families.

References 

Populated places in Shiraz County